Grilled ribs may refer to:
 Galbi, grilled beef or pork ribs in Korean cuisine
 Sườn nướng, grilled pork ribs in Vietnamese cuisine